Baruch Abuhatzeira (born 1941), also known as Baba Baruch, is a Moroccan-Israeli Kabbalist rabbi and spiritual adviser who operates in Netivot, a blue-collar town in southern Israel. He is the son of the leading Moroccan rabbi Israel Abuhatzeira, also known as the Baba Sali, and thus scion of the Abu Hasira/Abuhatzeira family.

Baruch was born in Arfoud in the Tafilalt region in eastern Morocco. There, he was educated by his father. During his youth Baruch spent several years in Paris. In the mid-1960s, Baruch emigrated to Israel with his father, and he decided to pursue a political career. He was elected deputy mayor in Ashkelon, and served on the city council as the leader of the local MAFDAL (National-Religious Party) faction. In this position, Abuhatzeira was convicted for taking bribes and served a five year sentence in Maasiyahu prison. After his release, Abuhatzeira joined his father Baba Sali, and was with him during the last three months of the Rabbi's life. 

During the shiva (week of mourning) on the death of the Baba Sali, Abuhatzeira donned his father's robe and announced himself as the Baba Sali's heir. Subsequently, however, the daily newspaper Hadashot published Abuhatzeira's letters to a woman who was not his wife, which he had written during his stint in prison. Abuhatzeira sued to prevent publication of the letters, but was denied, in part on the basis that the community he desired to lead had a legitimate interest in knowing his character. 

Abuhatzeira is the arch-rival of another Netivot mystic, Yaakov Israel Ifargan. In 2010, Netivot's city comptroller, Shimon Alon, allegedly at Abuhatzeira's behest, was arrested on suspicion of paying a young woman to seduce Ifargan and photograph him in intimate positions, with the aim of tarnishing his image.

References

1941 births
Living people
20th-century Israeli rabbis
21st-century Israeli rabbis
Deputy mayors of places in Israel
Israeli people convicted of bribery
Israeli politicians convicted of corruption
Israeli prisoners and detainees
Kabbalists
Moroccan emigrants to Israel
People from Ashkelon
People from Erfoud
Prisoners and detainees of Israel
Sephardic Haredi rabbis in Israel
Rabbis convicted of crimes